Pancher is a French surname. Notable people with the surname include:

Bertrand Pancher (born 1958), French politician
Jean Armand Isidore Pancher (1814–1877), French gardener and botanist

See also
Pacher
Pancheri

French-language surnames